Bouchercon is an annual convention of creators and devotees of mystery and detective fiction. It is named in honour of writer, reviewer, and editor Anthony Boucher; also the inspiration for the Anthony Awards, which have been issued at the convention since 1986. This page details Bouchercon XXXI and the 15th Anthony Awards ceremony.

Bouchercon
The convention was held September 7–10, 2000, in Denver. The event was chaired by mystery author Rebecca Bates and Tom Schantz, owner of Rue Morgue Press, publishers of mystery fiction.

Special Guests
Lifetime Achievement award — Jane Langton
Guest of Honor — Elmore Leonard
Fan Guest of Honor — Steve Stilwell
Toastmaster — Val McDermid

Anthony Awards
The following list details the awards distributed at the fifteenth annual Anthony Awards ceremony. The awards this year included celebrating those works which had had the biggest impact during the 20th century as a whole.

Novel award
Winner:
Peter Robinson, In a Dry Season

Shortlist:
Rennie Airth, River of Darkness
Jan Burke, Bones
Robert Crais, L.A. Requiem
Janet Evanovich, High Five

First novel award
Winner:
Donna Andrews, Murder with Peacocks

Shortlist:
Cara Black, Murder in the Marais
April Henry, Circles of Confusion
Kris Neri, Revenge of the Gypsy Queen
Paula Woods, Inner City Blues

Paperback original award
Winner:
Laura Lippman, In Big Trouble

Shortlist:
Robin Burcell, Every Move She Makes
Tony Dunbar, Lucky Man
Jose Latour, The Outcast
Caroline Roe, An Antidote for Avarice

Short story award
Winner:
Meg Chittenden, "Noir Lite", from Ellery Queen's Mystery Magazine January 1999

Shortlist:
Barry Baldwin, "A Bit of a Treat", from Alfred Hitchcock's Mystery Magazine September 1999
Judy & Bill Crider, "At the Hop", from Till Death Do us Part: ...stories of love, marriage, and murder
Jeffery Deaver, "Triangle", from Ellery Queen's Mystery Magazine March 1999
Laurie R. King, "Paleta Man", from Irreconciable Differences

Critical / Non-fiction award
Winner:
Willetta L. Heising, Detecting Women (3rd edition)

Shortlist:
Barbara Davey, The Mystery Review
George Easter, Deadly Pleasures
Tom Nolan, Ross MacDonald: a Biography
Daniel Stashower, Teller of Tales: The Life of Arthur Conan Doyle

Novel of the century award
Winner:
Daphne du Maurier, Rebecca

Shortlist:
Raymond Chandler, The Big Sleep
Dorothy L. Sayers, Gaudy Night
Dashiell Hammett, The Maltese Falcon
Agatha Christie, The Murder of Roger Ackroyd

Series of the century award
Winner:
Agatha Christie, Hercule Poirot series

Shortlist:
Ed McBain, 87th Precinct
Marcia Muller, Sharon McCone series
Dorothy L. Sayers, Lord Peter Wimsey series
Rex Stout, Nero Wolfe series

Writer of the century award
Winner:
Agatha Christie

Shortlist:
Raymond Chandler
Dashiell Hammett
Dorothy L. Sayers
Rex Stout

References

Anthony Awards
31
2000 in Colorado